Mitsuyuki (written: 光行, 光幸 or 充志) is a masculine Japanese given name. Notable people with the name include:

 (born 1933), Japanese fencer
 (born 1973), Japanese anime director
 (1163–1244), Japanese governor
 (born 1985), Japanese footballer

Japanese masculine given names